The Universities Tests Act 1871 was an Act of the Parliament of the United Kingdom. It abolished religious "Tests" and allowed Roman Catholics, non-conformists and non-Christians to take up professorships, fellowships, studentships and other lay offices at the Universities of Oxford, Cambridge and Durham. It also forbade religious tests for "any degree (other than a degree in divinity)".

The Act built upon earlier acts that had limited religious tests in the universities concerned. The Oxford University Act 1854 had abolished tests for the degree of BA, but not for higher degrees. The Cambridge University Act 1856 abolished tests for all degrees in Arts, Law, Music and Medicine, but stated that the degree would not enable the holder to become a member of senate or hold "any Office … which has been heretofore always held by a Member of the United Church of England and Ireland" unless they made a declaration that they were "bona fide a Member of the Church of England" (the latter provisions were abolished by the 1871 Act). The Dean and Chapter of Durham Cathedral (the governing body of Durham University at that time) changed the university's regulations in 1865 to remove religious tests on degrees (except in theology).

Passed during the course of William Ewart Gladstone's first ministry, the act was to obtain support from the non-conformists since these were a major support group for the Liberal Party.

The direct instigation for this legislation was the widely publicised case of Numa Edward Hartog, the first Jewish Senior Wrangler in the history of Cambridge University, who could not accept the fellowship that would otherwise routinely be offered, because he could not subscribe to the required test on account of his religion. His testimony before the House of Lords helped secure passage of the bill, after the Lords had twice blocked similar legislation in 1869 and 1870.

Numa Hartog would have been the first Jew after the passing of this act to be elected a fellow at the University of Cambridge, but he died of smallpox. The first Jew to be elected a fellow was Samuel Alexander at Lincoln College, University of Oxford in 1882.

See also
 Universities Act 1825

Notes

References

External links
 Recorder's Notes of Test Act Debate
 1871 Universities Tests Act

1871 in England
History of the University of Oxford
History of the University of Cambridge
Durham University
Christianity in Oxford
Religion in Cambridge
History of education in England
United Kingdom Acts of Parliament 1871
1871 in education
Law about religion in the United Kingdom
University-related legislation
1871 in religion
University reform